Ee Kaikalil is a 1986 Indian Malayalam-language film, directed by K. Madhu and produced by Prem Prakash. The film is a remake of the 1974 Hindi film Majboor. The film stars Mammootty, Seema, Shobhana and Ratheesh. The film has musical score by Johnson and A. J. Joseph. It was a commercial failure.

Cast
 Mammootty as Sultan Abdul Razak
 Ratheesh as Jayadevan
 Janardanan as Madhava Menon
 Thilakan as Ummachan
 Prem Prakash as Police Officer
 Kunchan as Khadir
 Innocent as Ittoopp
 Seema as Saritha
 Shobhana as Viji Balakrishnan
 Sukumari

Soundtrack
The music was composed by A. J. Joseph and the lyrics were written by K. Jayakumar.

References

External links
 

1986 films
1980s Malayalam-language films
Malayalam remakes of Hindi films
Films directed by K. Madhu